Franz Josef Rudigier (7 April 1811 – 29 November 1884) was an Austrian Roman Catholic prelate and served as the Bishop of Linz from his appointment in 1853 until his death. Much of his local diocese grew due to his vigorous in promoting evangelic zeal and fundamental religious principles. His deep faith and will made him the intellectual figurehead of prelates in their struggle with liberalism.

Rudigier was a zealous friend and promoter of religious expression and prompted schools and religious associations to that end and oversaw the construction of churches and religious order houses which increased during his episcopate; he also promoted and encouraged the Christian press. Ever memorable is the stand he took on behalf of the 1855 concordat that the liberals opposed and annulled without papal consultation in 1868 and in 1870.

The beatification process for the bishop started under Pope Pius X on 6 December 1905 and he was titled as a Servant of God. The confirmation of his model life of heroic virtue on 3 April 2009 allowed for Pope Benedict XVI to name him as Venerable.

Life

Franz Joseph Rudigier was born in the Austrian Empire on 7 April 1811 as the last of eight children to Johann Christian Rudigier and Maria Josepha Tschofen.

In 1823 he was sent to learn Latin under his brother Joseph - who had just been ordained as a priest - and then attended college at Innsbruck before deciding to start his studies to become a priest. In 1831 he commenced his studies to become a priest in Brixen and was elevated to the diaconate on 5 April 1835. Rudigier was ordained to the priesthood in Bressanone on 12 April 1835. The new priest was assigned as a pastor at Vandans and then from 1836 to Bürs until 1838 when he moved to the capital of Vienna for further studies at the Saint Augustine institute; in 1839 he was made a professor of canon law at Brixen when he returned there. Rudigier also served as a teacher of Emperor Franz Joseph I and his brother Maximilian I. In 1848 he was made the provost of San Candido and in 1850 the canon of Brixen.

Franz Joseph I - on 19 December 1852 - selected Rudigier to become the Bishop of Linz and submitted this recommendation to Pope Pius IX who confirmed the appointment on 10 March 1853; he was enthroned in his new diocese on 12 June 1853 and received his episcopal consecration on 5 June 1853 from the Cardinal Archbishop of Bologna Michele Viale-Prelà.

The papal proclamation of the dogma of the Immaculate Conception in 1854 prompted the bishop to initiate the construction of a new diocesan cathedral in 1855 in honor of this occasion - construction was completed in 1924 after the bishop's death. He issued a pastoral letter on 7 September 1868 that called the faithful to oppose new marriage laws and he was arrested on 5 July 1869 and then sentenced for two weeks effective the sentencing hearing on 12 July; he was released on 26 July and received an imperial pardon on 27 July. He liked the notion of prison being a chance to suffer in the name of Jesus Christ.

Rudigier died on 29 November 1884. His final words were the last verses of the Stabat Mater:

"Christe, cum sit hinc exire, da per matrem me venire ad palmam victoriae. Quando corpus morietur, fac, ut anisme donetur. Paradisi gloria".

His breathing ceased and he died without having uttered the Amen. His remains were interred at the Old Cathedral but in 1924 moved to the new cathedral he had commissioned back in 1855.

Beatification process

The beatification process commenced in the Linz diocese in an informative process that Bishop Franz Maria Doppelbauer inaugurated on 28 February 1895 and later concluded in a solemn Mass held on 15 December 1900. Twin rogatory processes were held both in the Diocese of Rome and the Diocese of Brescia from 13 May 1897 until 2 June 1898 while all of Rudigier's spiritual writings received the approval of theologians as being in line with Christian doctrine on 1 March 1902. The formal introduction to the cause came under Pope Pius X on 6 December 1905 and the late bishop became titled as a Servant of God.

An apostolic process was held in Linz that Doppelbauer opened on 8 November 1906 while the same bishop later closed it on 3 July 1903; the Congregation for Rites validated this process in Rome on 8 July 1914. A second apostolic process opened in Linz on 15 December 1926 under Bishop Johannes Maria Gföllner and closed later in 1931; this also received C.O.R. validation on 14 January 1853 and an antepreparatory committee later approved the cause and its continuation on 24 November 1964. The Congregation for the Causes of Saints later validated all previous processes on 7 June 2002 and received the official Positio dossier from the postulation in 2002.

Theologians voiced their assent to the cause on 30 May 2008 and the cardinal and bishop members of the C.C.S. also voiced their approval for the cause on 20 January 2009. The confirmation of Rudigier's model Christian life of heroic virtue allowed for Pope Benedict XVI to name Rudigier as Venerable on 3 April 2009.

The miracle required for his beatification was investigated and then received validation from the C.C.S. on 7 June 2002. The medical board approved this miracle a decade later on 16 December 2010.

The current postulator for this cause is Dr. Andrea Ambrosi.

References

External links
Hagiography Circle
Saints SQPN
Catholic Hierarchy 

1811 births
1884 deaths
19th-century venerated Christians
Roman Catholic bishops in the Austrian Empire
Higher Scientific Institute for Diocesan Priests at St. Augustine's alumni
Bishops of Linz
Venerated Catholics
Venerated Catholics by Pope Benedict XVI